"Power Play" is the 115th episode of the American science fiction television series Star Trek: The Next Generation. It is the 15th episode of the fifth season.

Set in the 24th century, the series follows the adventures of the Starfleet crew of the Federation starship Enterprise-D. In this episode, alien entities take over the minds of Data, Troi, and Miles O'Brien.

The story begins when the spaceship picks up a distress signal, and upon investigation seems to be coming from the USS Essex, a spaceship lost two hundred years earlier.

The episode is noted for having five different writers involved in the story and screenplay.

Casting
This episode includes Rosalind Chao playing Keiko, who also appeared in episodes such as "Data's Day", "The Wounded", "Disaster", and went on to have a recurring guest role in Star Trek Deep: Space Nine.

Plot

The USS Enterprise approaches Mab-Bu VI, a moon covered in electromagnetic storms, from where it has detected a distress call. Lt. Commander Data discovers that the distress call is standard for Daedalus-class starships, which went out of service 172 years ago. He then finds that the USS Essex, a Daedalus-class ship, was lost in the region over 200 years ago. After concluding that visiting a ghost ship with an away team in such hazardous conditions is a waste of resources, Picard decides to move on and report the whereabouts of the once-missing ship. However, Troi indicates that she feels a living presence on the surface. Data announces that electromagnetic interference precludes the use of the transporter to the moon; Picard authorizes a shuttlecraft mission, crewed by Riker, Data, and Troi.

As the shuttlecraft travels towards the moon's surface, the crew loses control, and makes a crash landing. By the time the shuttle lands, all communication with the Enterprise has been cut off by electromagnetic interference. Riker suspects he has a broken arm due to the crash landing and the three crew members emerge from the shuttlecraft to learn about their surroundings. They observe the front of a massive electrical storm. A tricorder scan indicates EM bursts across the entire spectrum.

Back on the Enterprise, the crew discuss rescuing the crew of the shuttle. Ro Laren uses the descent angle of the shuttlecraft to approximate the landing site. Transporter chief Miles O'Brien proposes that he should transport to the surface and use a pattern-enhancing device to allow a reliable transport of the away team. O'Brien acknowledges the risk and Picard grants permission.

O'Brien safely transports to Mab-Bu VI and he is greeted with relief by Riker. As O'Brien prepares the transport procedure, the crew is struck by what appear to be bolts of electricity, incapacitating all four members. Three light sources enter the bodies of Data, Troi, and O'Brien, and Riker awakens to finish the pattern buffers. All four are then safely transported back to the Enterprise.

When they awaken, Data, Troi, and O'Brien insist that the Enterprise conduct a survey of the southern polar region of the moon. The rest of the crew refuse. The three then stage a violent uprising and take command of the ship. They use hostages as leverage to force Picard to change course. Dr. Crusher determines that Riker was not affected because the pain from his broken arm repelled whatever force possessed the others. Troi, the leader of the mutineers, then reveals that she is the captain of the Essex. She claims that their spirits were trapped in the electromagnetic fields of the moon and if the Enterprise transports their bones back to Earth, they can be set free. However, Picard is skeptical of her claim because of their violent actions.

La Forge, Crusher, and Ro devise a plan to separate the possessive entities from the crew members' bodies by inducing pain, then containing them by flooding the area with a particle field. However the plan fails when Data suddenly moves out of the attack area. After Data threatens to kill everyone in the room, Picard agrees to comply with their demands. He tells Riker to let Data, Troi, and O'Brien move safely to one of the cargo bays. Picard, Worf, and Keiko O'Brien accompany them as hostages.

After they arrive, Picard challenges Troi about her claim to be captain of the Essex and she reveals that the moon is a penal colony. The prisoners had previously attempted to take over the Essex and her crew to escape the colony, but the ship had crashed during the attempt. O'Brien uses the transporter to beam hundreds of other prisoner entities into the cargo bay. These prisoners are to take over additional crew members' bodies so they can commandeer the Enterprise and return to their home planet.

The bridge crew activates the particle field, which sequesters the other prisoners. They then prepare to blow the cargo bay hatch, which would kill the six crew members in addition to all the prisoners. Picard, Worf, and Keiko each declare that they are willing to die, which forces the three prisoners to relinquish their hosts. Worf beams all prisoners back to the moon.

Data apologizes to Worf for the way he acted when possessed by a prisoner, adding that Worf must have exercised extreme self-control to not fight back. Worf says "You have no idea."

Reception 
In 2011, The A.V. Club gave this episode a B− grade, suggesting it was "pretty good but not great". Keith DeCandido of Tor.com gave the episode a 7 out of 10 rating.

In 2013, it was described as "rousing action yarn" with "delightfully malevolent " acting performances by the cast in the book Star Trek FAQ 2.0 (Unofficial and Unauthorized): Everything Left to Know About the Next Generation, the Movies, and Beyond. They praised it as one of the most exciting episodes of the season, bringing together adventuresome writing with good acting.

Releases 
The episode was released in the United States on November 5, 2002, as part of the season five DVD box set. The first Blu-ray release was in the United States on November 18, 2013, followed by the United Kingdom the next day, November 19, 2013.

References

External links
 

Star Trek: The Next Generation (season 5) episodes
1992 American television episodes
Television episodes written by Brannon Braga
Television episodes directed by David Livingston